JPMorgan Asia Growth & Income is a large British investment trust dedicated to investments in Asia excluding Japan. The company is listed on the London Stock Exchange. The Chairman is Bronwyn Curtis.

History
The company was established in 1997. It changed its name from JPMorgan Asian Investment Trust to JPMorgan Asia Growth & Income on 13 February 2020.

References

External links
  Official site

Investment trusts of the United Kingdom
JPMorgan Chase